New Mountain is a mountain in Antarctica. It was charted and named by the British National Antarctic Expedition, 1901–04.

References
 

Mountains of Victoria Land
McMurdo Dry Valleys